Environmental Development is a quarterly peer-reviewed academic journal covering environmental science and policy published by Elsevier. In January 2018, Natarajan Ishwaran became the new editor-in-chief. He succeeded Eleanor Milne (Colorado State University, now Subject Editor for Climate Change) EIC from July 2015. The founding editor was Theo Beckers (Tilburg University).

The journal is associated with the Scientific Committee on Problems of the Environment (SCOPE) and is abstracted and indexed in the Emerging Sources Citation Index and Scopus.

References

External links

Environmental science journals
Elsevier academic journals
Publications established in 2012
Quarterly journals
English-language journals